Bourne Brook is a common name for a small river, reflected in a number of locations.  See:

 Bourne Brook a tributary of the River Tame, West Midlands. It joins the Tame near Fazeley in Staffordshire.
 There is another Bourne Brook in Staffordshire, a stream that flows into the River Trent near Kings Bromley.
 A third Bourne Brook feeds into the River Rom at Bournebridge in Essex.

See also
 Bourn Brook (disambiguation)
 Bourne (disambiguation)